Stafford House is a mansion in the St. James's district in the West End of London.

Stafford House may also refer to:

in Canada
Joseph Stafford House, listed on the Canadian Register of Historic Places

in the United Kingdom
 Stafford House College, a school in Canterbury, England

in the United States
 Francis M. Stafford House, Paintsville, Kentucky
Frederick H. and Elizabeth Stafford House, Port Hope, Michigan
William R. Stafford House, Port Hope, Michigan
Captain John H. Stafford House, Bronx, New York, a New York City Landmark
John Stafford House, Columbus, Texas, formerly listed on the National Register of Historic Places